Khanaura is a village in the Hoshiarpur district of Punjab, India.

History
Khanaura is a Pre 1947 Muslim Village. It has Muslim Graves well looked after from pre 1947 times.

Population
According to Census 2011, The Khanaura village has population of 2,714 of which 1434 are males while 1,280 are females.

Most of the villagers are from Schedule Caste. Schedule Caste (SC) constitutes 55.01% of total population. The village currently doesn't have any Schedule Tribe (ST) population.

References

Villages in Hoshiarpur district